Buchananius sulcatus is a species of flower weevil in the beetle family Curculionidae. It is found in North America. The development takes place in fungi.

References

Baridinae
Articles created by Qbugbot
Beetles described in 1876